The 2023 Madhya Pradesh Legislative Assembly election is scheduled to be held in or before November 2023 to elect all 230 members of the state's Legislative Assembly. Shivraj Singh Chouhan is expected to be the incumbent chief minister at the time of the election.

Background 
The tenure of Madhya Pradesh Legislative Assembly is scheduled to end on 6 January 2024. The previous assembly elections were held in November 2018. After the election, Indian National Congress formed the state government, with Kamal Nath becoming the Chief Minister.

Political developments 

In March 2020, 22 Congress MLAs resigned from the assembly, and defected to Bharatiya Janata Party along with Jyotiraditya Scindia, resulting in the collapse of the state government and resignation by Chief Minister Kamal Nath. Subsequently BJP formed the state government, with Shivraj Singh Chouhan becoming Chief Minister.

Schedule

Parties and alliances





Others

References 

Madhya
State Assembly elections in Madhya Pradesh
2023 State Assembly elections in India